Vandor is a surname. Notable people with the surname include:
 Augusto Vandor (1923–1969), Argentine trade unionist and politician
 Douglas Vandor (born 1974), Canadian rower
 Ivan Vandor (born 1932), Italian composer, musician, and ethnomusicologist
 Joseph Vandor (1909–1979), Roman Catholic priest
 Sándor Vándor (1901–1945), Hungarian Jewish composer